Clássico Majestoso (English: Majestic Derby) is the name given to the matches between Brazilian clubs Corinthians and São Paulo FC both being football teams from the state of São Paulo. The name was first used by Gazeta Esportiva newspaper's Thomaz Mazzoni. Historically, the match is marked by many controversial moments, such as fights and the rivalry is regarded as one of the biggest in Brazil.

Along with Santos and Palmeiras, Corinthians and São Paulo are often referred to as the four major São Paulo football teams.

Matches statistics 
General

Last Match: São Paulo 1–1 Corinthians (2022 Campeonato Brasileiro Série A, 11 September 2022)

Campeonato Brasileiro
including Torneio Roberto Gomes Pedrosa

Last Match: São Paulo 1–1 Corinthians (2022 Campeonato Brasileiro Série A, 11 September 2022)

Campeonato Paulista

Last Match: São Paulo 2–1 Corinthians (2022 Campeonato Paulista, 27 March 2022)

Titles comparison

Note: Although the Intercontinental Cup and the FIFA Club World Cup are officially different tournaments, in Brazil they are treated many times as the same tournament.

Straight decisions of titles 
 Campeonato Paulista

 April 13, 1938: Corinthians 1-1 São Paulo - Corinthians Champion
 December 31, 1957: São Paulo 3-1 Corinthians - São Paulo Champion
 December 8, 1982: São Paulo 0-1 Corinthians
 December 12, 1982: Corinthians 3-1 São Paulo - Corinthians Champion
 December 11, 1983: São Paulo 0-1 Corinthians
 December 14, 1983: Corinthians 1-1 São Paulo - Corinthians Champion
 August 26, 1987: São Paulo 2-1 Corinthians
 August 30, 1987: Corinthians 0-0 São Paulo - São Paulo Champion
 December 8, 1991: São Paulo 3-0 Corinthians
 December 12, 1991: Corinthians 0-0 São Paulo - São Paulo Champion
 June 05, 1997: Corinthians 1-1 São Paulo - Corinthians Champion
 May 3, 1998: São Paulo 1-2 Corinthians
 May 10, 1998: Corinthians 1-3 São Paulo - São Paulo Champion
 March 16, 2003: Corinthians 3-2 São Paulo
 March 22, 2003: São Paulo 2-3 Corinthians - Corinthians Champion

 Campeonato Brasileiro
 December 13, 1990: São Paulo 0-1 Corinthians
 December 16, 1990: Corinthians 1-0 São Paulo - Corinthians Champion

 Torneio Rio-São Paulo
 December 5, 2002: São Paulo 2-3 Corinthians
 December 12, 2002: Corinthians 1-1 São Paulo - Corinthians Champion

 Recopa Sul-Americana
 July 3, 2013: São Paulo 1-2 Corinthians
 July 17, 2013: Corinthians 2-0 São Paulo - Corinthians Champion

 Florida Cup (Friendly title)

 January 21, 2017: São Paulo 0(4)-(3)0 Corinthians - São Paulo Champion

Biggest victories 
 São Paulo 6-1 on September 10, 1933
 Corinthians 6-1 on November 22, 2015
 Corinthians 5-0 on March 10, 1996
 Corinthians 5-0 on June 26, 2011
 São Paulo 5-1 on January 1, 1946
 Corinthians 5-1 on April 16, 1947
 Corinthians 5-1 on June 3, 1962
 São Paulo 5-1 on May 8, 2005
 São Paulo 4-0 on October 15, 1944
 Corinthians 4-0 on August 26, 1951
 São Paulo 4-0 on August 10, 1980
 Corinthians 4-0 on June 6, 1999
 São Paulo 4-0 on November 05, 2016
 São Paulo 4-1 on January 10, 1932
 Corinthians 4-1 on March 24, 1940

Stadia 
In the beginning, Corinthians played its games at Estádio Alfredo Schürig, and São Paulo at Estádio da Floresta, and later at the Pacaembu, which eventually became home of the dérbi. From the 1970s on, the Morumbi became the new home for the derby, at the request of Tricolor Paulista.
Since the opening of the new stadium, Corinthians has played its home games there.

League matches
These are only the league matches, club name in bold indicate win. The score is given at full-time (T), in the goals columns the goalscorer and time when goal was scored is noted.

Head-to-head results

See also 
 Derby Paulista
 Choque-Rei

References 

  Arquivo Tricolor- São Paulo vs. Corinthians
  History of games
  Classic is classic
  Page of Corinthians in FIFA
  Page of Sao Paulo in FIFA
  https://web.archive.org/web/20090214040237/http://br.geocities.com/spfchistoria2/corinthians_sp.htm
  Football Derbies
  https://web.archive.org/web/20080417160831/http://paginas.terra.com.br/esporte/rsssfbrasil/tables/sp1931.htm

Brazilian football derbies
Sport Club Corinthians Paulista
São Paulo FC